James Dunham (born November 22, 1963) is an American former ice sledge hockey player. He won a gold medal with the USA team at the 2002 Winter Paralympics.

References

Living people
1963 births
Paralympic sledge hockey players of the United States
American sledge hockey players
Paralympic gold medalists for the United States
Sportspeople from Kansas City, Missouri
Medalists at the 2002 Winter Paralympics
Paralympic medalists in sledge hockey
Ice sledge hockey players at the 2002 Winter Paralympics